= Cheesetown, Pennsylvania =

Unincorporated community in Pennsylvania, US

Coordinates: 39°57′59″N 77°41′38″W

Cheesetown is an unincorporated community in Franklin County, in the U.S. state of Pennsylvania.

== History ==
Cheesetown was laid out around 1840.
